William Watson (1858–1925) was a British botanist and horticulturist. He was a gardener at the Royal Botanic Gardens, Kew from 1879, Assistant Curator 1886–1901 and Curator 1901–1922. Watson was awarded the Veitch Memorial Medal in 1892 and elected as an Associate of the Linnean Society in 1904.

The species Hebenstretia watsonii was named in his honour.

See also
 :Category:Taxa named by William Watson (botanist)

References

External links
 
 

English botanists
English taxonomists
1858 births
1925 deaths
Botanists active in Kew Gardens
19th-century British botanists
20th-century British botanists